= Oita Hofu High School =

Coordinates: 33°12′26″N 131°36′19″E

Oita Hofu High School Japanese: 大分県立大分豊府中学校・高等学校

Information
- Established: April 1986; 39 years ago

Ōita Hōfu High School (大分県立大分豊府中学校・高等学校, Ōitakenritsu Ōita Hōfu Chūgakkō & Kōtōgakkō) is a Junior high school and High school in Ōita, Ōita, Japan. The school opened in April 1986, and the junior high school was added in April 2007.
